The 2019 Wisconsin Badgers football team represented the University of Wisconsin–Madison in the 2019 NCAA Division I FBS football season. The Badgers were led by fifth-year head coach Paul Chryst and competed as members of the West Division of the Big Ten Conference. They played their home games at Camp Randall Stadium in Madison, Wisconsin.

Wisconsin began the year with six dominating victories, including outscoring their three non-conference opponents 158–0, and beating then-No. 11 Michigan 35–14 in the conference opener. The Badgers rose to sixth in the AP Poll, but suffered their first loss to unranked Illinois, who were 32.5-point underdogs. The next week, Wisconsin lost soundly to Ohio State, 38–7. To close out the regular season, the team beat rival and eighth-ranked Minnesota on the road to secure their place in the Big Ten Championship Game. There, Wisconsin fell to Ohio State a second time, 34–21. They were invited to the Rose Bowl to play Pac-12 Conference champion Oregon, where they lost, 28–27, to end the year with a 10–4 record. It was their fourth Rose Bowl loss in a row, after 3 straight from 2011 to 2013.

The Badgers were led on offense by junior running back Jonathan Taylor, who, for the second consecutive year, was the recipient of the Doak Walker Award and was a unanimous All-American. Taylor finished tied atop the Big Ten Conference and third nationally with Ohio State's J. K. Dobbins with 2,003 yards and 21 touchdowns. Center Tyler Biadasz was also a unanimous All-American. Quarterback Jack Coan led the passing game, finishing with 2,727 yards and 18 touchdowns on the year. Defensively, the team was led by first-team all-conference linebacker Zack Baun, who led the team with 12.5 sacks.

Previous season
The 2018 team started the year at fourth in the pre-season AP Poll, tied for the highest start in school history. The team finished with a disappointing five regular season losses, and were invited to the Pinstripe Bowl to play Miami (FL) in a rematch of the 2017 Orange Bowl. The Badgers won the rematch and finished the year at 8–5.

Offseason

2019 NFL Draft

Recruiting
Wisconsin signed a total of 19 recruits in the class of 2019. The class was ranked as the sixth best class in the Big Ten Conference and the 27th best class nationally by the 247Sports Composite, and was headlined by consensus five-star offensive lineman Logan Brown and four-star quarterback Graham Mertz, who was rated as the best pocket passer in the country by ESPN. Mertz was named MVP of the high school all-star game the All-American Bowl.

Preseason

Award watch lists
Listed in the order that they were released

Preseason Big Ten poll
Although the Big Ten Conference has not held an official preseason poll since 2010, Cleveland.com has polled sports journalists representing all member schools as a de facto preseason media poll since 2011. For the 2019 poll, Wisconsin was projected to finish in third in the West Division.

Schedule
Wisconsin's 2019 schedule began with two non-conference home games, first against South Florida of the American Athletic Conference, and then against Central Michigan of the Mid-American Conference. Wisconsin's third non-conference game, against Kent State, also of the Mid-American Conference, was played in October.

In Big Ten Conference play, Wisconsin played all members of the West Division, and drew Michigan, Michigan State, and Ohio State from the East Division.

The Badgers started the season with two shutouts over South Florida and Central Michigan. However, their signature game came against  then-No. 11 Michigan in their Big Ten opener, where the Badgers scored 35 unanswered points to start the game before resting the team's starters and allowing two touchdowns from the Wolverines. The team's dominance continued over the next three games, including a shutout victory over Michigan State. In the first six games, Wisconsin only allowed three combined points from the first half (a field goal by Northwestern). Several analysts saw the Badgers as contenders for a spot in the College Football Playoff.

However, a week before the Ohio State game, the Badgers suffered their first loss, as a 31-point favorite, at Illinois on a game-winning field goal. Several experts marked this moment as a downward turning point for the Badgers, as they were not able to recover in time tor the Ohio State game, losing in Columbus as well.

The Badgers would bounce back, however, with a narrow home victory versus a ranked Iowa, and a blowout win on the road against a top-ten Minnesota. They would then rematch against Ohio State in the Big Ten Championship game, leading for the first three quarters but falling to a late rally from the Buckeyes.

As Big Ten runner up, Wisconsin was invited to the 2020 Rose Bowl to play Pac-12 Champion Oregon. The Badgers lost the game by one point.

Source:

Roster

Rankings

Game summaries

at South Florida

Central Michigan

Michigan

Northwestern

This was the first game of the season where the Badgers allowed an opponent to score points in the first half.

Kent State

Michigan State

Wisconsin became the first FBS team since Oklahoma in 1967 to put up 4 shutouts in its first 6 games after their game against Michigan State.

at Illinois

No. 6 Wisconsin was upset on the road by unranked Illinois, who took the lead for the first time in the entire game as the clock ran out, with a 39-yard field goal. The loss, along with the loss to Ohio State in the following week, all but ended Wisconsin's national championship hopes.

at Ohio State (regular season)

Iowa

at Nebraska

Purdue

at Minnesota

vs. Ohio State (Big Ten Championship Game)

This was Wisconsin 3rd rematch in a Big Ten Championship Game. Previously the Badgers played and beat Michigan State in 2011 and Nebraska in 2012 after losing to them in their regular season matchup.

vs. Oregon (Rose Bowl)

Awards and honors

Players drafted into the NFL

References

Wisconsin
Wisconsin Badgers football seasons
Wisconsin Badgers football